The Itaquai River is a river of the upper Amazon Basin. It forms the eastern boundary of Atalaia do Norte municipality in the Amazonas state of north-western Brazil. Its main tributary is the Rio Branco. Downstream it joins the Ituí River to form the upper Solimões.

See also
Korubo
List of rivers of Amazonas
Vale do Javari

References
Brazilian Ministry of Transport

Rivers of Amazonas (Brazilian state)